The 2019 Atlantic Coast Conference baseball tournament was held from May 21 through 26 at Durham Bulls Athletic Park in Durham, North Carolina.  The annual tournament determined the conference champion of the Division I Atlantic Coast Conference for college baseball.  The tournament champion, North Carolina, received the league's automatic bid to the 2019 NCAA Division I baseball tournament.  This was the last of 19 athletic championship events held by the conference in the 2018–19 academic year.

The tournament has been held every year but one since 1973, with Clemson winning ten championships, the most all-time.  Georgia Tech has won nine championships, and defending champion Florida State has won eight titles since their entry to the league in 1992.  Charter league member Duke, along with recent entrants Virginia Tech, Boston College, Pittsburgh, Notre Dame and Louisville have never won the event.

Format and seeding
The winner of each seven team division and the top ten other teams based on conference winning percentage, regardless of division, from the conference's regular season were seeded one through twelve.  Seeds one and two were awarded to the two division winners.  Teams were then divided into four pools of three teams each, with the winners advancing to single elimination bracket for the championship.

If a 1–1 tie were to occur among all three teams in a pool, the highest seeded team would have advanced to the semifinals. Because of this, seeds 5–12 must win both pool play games to advance to the single-elimination bracket, and seeds 1–4 must only win the game against the winner of the game between the other two teams in the pool to advance. For example, if the 12 seed beats the 8 seed in the first game, then the winner of the 12 seed versus 1 seed advances, and the 8 seed versus 1 seed game has no effect on which team advances.

Schedule and results

Schedule 

Source:

Pool Play

Pool A

Pool B

Pool C

Pool D

Final

Championship Game

All–Tournament Team

Source:

References

Tournament
Atlantic Coast Conference baseball tournament
Atlantic Coast Conference baseball tournament
Atlantic Coast Conference baseball tournament
Baseball competitions in Durham, North Carolina
College baseball tournaments in North Carolina